Elysius ochrota is a moth of the family Erebidae first described by George Hampson in 1901. It is found in Bolivia.

References

Moths described in 1901
ochrota
Moths of South America